Mayoral and municipal elections were held in San Jose, Costa Rica, on 2 February 2020 and were the method by which the citizens of the canton of San José elected the mayor, deputy mayors, syndics, aldermen and district councilors of the capital municipality.

Incumbent Johnny Araya returns to his original party, National Liberation Party, after a two-year suspension from the Ethics' Tribunal due to his resignation as presindential nominee in the 2014 Costa Rican general election, reason for which Araya was candidate from the local San José Alliance party winning previous 2016 San José mayoral election, but returning to PLN soon after. Other important candidates were PAC's nominee, economist and urban planner and founder of Rutas Naturbanas, Federico Cartín Arteaga and San José Alliance nominee Denise Echeverría Robert. Cartín was originally part of a coalition named Chepe which was integrated by PAC and the provincial party VAMOS, however the Electoral Court disbanded the coalition as VAMOS failed to nominate any of its members, a requeriment to be a coalition, but VAMOS kept its support of the candidacy. Cartín managed to return PAC as the second most voted party in San José.

Results

References

San José, Costa Rica
2020 elections in Costa Rica
Mayoral elections in Costa Rica
2020 in Costa Rica